Jens Bojsen-Møller (born 8 June 1966) is a Danish sailor and Olympic medalist. He competed at the 1992 Summer Olympics in Barcelona and won a bronze medal in the Flying Dutchman class, together with his cousin Jørgen Bojsen-Møller.

Jens Bojsen-Møller became Master of Science (MSc) in 1999 and PhD in 2005 from the University of Copenhagen.

References

External links
 
 
 

1966 births
Living people
Danish male sailors (sport)
Sailors at the 1992 Summer Olympics – Flying Dutchman
Sailors at the 1996 Summer Olympics – Soling
Olympic sailors of Denmark
Olympic bronze medalists for Denmark
Olympic medalists in sailing
Medalists at the 1992 Summer Olympics
Flying Dutchman class world champions
World champions in sailing for Denmark
Soling class world champions